The 1981 VFL season was the 85th season of the Victorian Football League (VFL), the highest level senior Australian rules football competition in Victoria. The season featured twelve clubs, ran from 28 March until 26 September, and comprised a 22-game home-and-away season followed by a finals series featuring the top five clubs.

The premiership was won by the Carlton Football Club for the 13th time, after it defeated  by 20 points in the 1981 VFL Grand Final.

Night series
 defeated  9.11 (65) to 6.5 (41) in the final.

Premiership season

Round 1

|- style="background:#ccf;"
| Home team
| Home team score
| Away team
| Away team score
| Venue
| Crowd
| Date
|- style="background:#fff;"
| 
| 21.19 (145)
| 
| 12.25 (97)
| Arden Street Oval
| 19,437
| 28 March 1981
|- style="background:#fff;"
| 
| 16.12 (108)
| 
| 23.19 (157)
| Western Oval
| 19,101
| 28 March 1981
|- style="background:#fff;"
| 
| 16.16 (112)
| 
| 23.15 (153)
| MCG
| 32,202
| 28 March 1981
|- style="background:#fff;"
| 
| 10.17 (77)
| 
| 10.11 (71)
| Kardinia Park
| 37,303
| 28 March 1981
|- style="background:#fff;"
| 
| 20.13 (133)
| 
| 22.27 (159)
| Junction Oval
| 27,200
| 28 March 1981
|- style="background:#fff;"
| 
| 22.12 (144)
| 
| 12.10 (82)
| VFL Park
| 56,372
| 28 March 1981

Round 2

|- style="background:#ccf;"
| Home team
| Home team score
| Away team
| Away team score
| Venue
| Crowd
| Date
|- style="background:#fff;"
| 
| 16.15 (111)
| 
| 15.9 (99)
| Windy Hill
| 26,443
| 4 April 1981
|- style="background:#fff;"
| 
| 26.22 (178)
| 
| 13.6 (84)
| Victoria Park
| 26,512
| 4 April 1981
|- style="background:#fff;"
| 
| 16.14 (110)
| 
| 22.13 (145)
| Lake Oval
| 17,850
| 4 April 1981
|- style="background:#fff;"
| 
| 14.23 (107)
| 
| 16.13 (109)
| Moorabbin Oval
| 24,496
| 4 April 1981
|- style="background:#fff;"
| 
| 16.11 (107)
| 
| 17.21 (123)
| Princes Park
| 31,660
| 4 April 1981
|- style="background:#fff;"
| 
| 23.17 (155)
| 
| 16.14 (110)
| VFL Park
| 20,107
| 4 April 1981

Round 3

|- style="background:#ccf;"
| Home team
| Home team score
| Away team
| Away team score
| Venue
| Crowd
| Date
|- style="background:#fff;"
| 
| 18.11 (119)
| 
| 18.12 (120)
| Western Oval
| 13,256
| 11 April 1981
|- style="background:#fff;"
| 
| 14.24 (108)
| 
| 12.20 (92)
| Princes Park
| 24,780
| 11 April 1981
|- style="background:#fff;"
| 
| 15.26 (116)
| 
| 14.5 (89)
| Arden Street Oval
| 17,744
| 11 April 1981
|- style="background:#fff;"
| 
| 17.16 (118)
| 
| 16.18 (114)
| MCG
| 61,908
| 11 April 1981
|- style="background:#fff;"
| 
| 19.21 (135)
| 
| 23.19 (157)
| Moorabbin Oval
| 33,882
| 11 April 1981
|- style="background:#fff;"
| 
| 21.13 (139)
| 
| 18.9 (117)
| VFL Park
| 21,977
| 11 April 1981

Round 4

|- style="background:#ccf;"
| Home team
| Home team score
| Away team
| Away team score
| Venue
| Crowd
| Date
|- style="background:#fff;"
| 
| 10.16 (76)
| 
| 16.32 (128)
| MCG
| 36,488
| 18 April 1981
|- style="background:#fff;"
| 
| 25.19 (169)
| 
| 14.16 (100)
| Junction Oval
| 15,635
| 18 April 1981
|- style="background:#fff;"
| 
| 13.17 (95)
| 
| 17.22 (124)
| VFL Park
| 48,526
| 18 April 1981
|- style="background:#fff;"
| 
| 11.13 (79)
| 
| 13.16 (94)
| Windy Hill
| 29,597
| 20 April 1981
|- style="background:#fff;"
| 
| 9.14 (68)
| 
| 11.10 (76)
| Kardinia Park
| 42,395
| 20 April 1981
|- style="background:#fff;"
| 
| 11.10 (76)
| 
| 15.14 (104)
| VFL Park
| 27,299
| 20 April 1981

Round 5

|- style="background:#ccf;"
| Home team
| Home team score
| Away team
| Away team score
| Venue
| Crowd
| Date
|- style="background:#fff;"
| 
| 17.16 (118)
| 
| 11.17 (83)
| Princes Park
| 16,106
| 25 April 1981
|- style="background:#fff;"
| 
| 21.20 (146)
| 
| 13.5 (83)
| Victoria Park
| 30,096
| 25 April 1981
|- style="background:#fff;"
| 
| 15.22 (112)
| 
| 11.18 (84)
| MCG
| 46,230
| 25 April 1981
|- style="background:#fff;"
| 
| 18.22 (130)
| 
| 9.14 (68)
| Lake Oval
| 12,545
| 25 April 1981
|- style="background:#fff;"
| 
| 10.13 (73)
| 
| 19.23 (137)
| Moorabbin Oval
| 32,341
| 25 April 1981
|- style="background:#fff;"
| 
| 15.14 (104)
| 
| 19.11 (125)
| VFL Park
| 33,465
| 25 April 1981

Round 6

Round 7

|- style="background:#ccf;"
| Home team
| Home team score
| Away team
| Away team score
| Venue
| Crowd
| Date
|- style="background:#fff;"
| 
| 13.14 (92)
| 
| 12.16 (88)
| Junction Oval
| 12,997
| 9 May 1981
|- style="background:#fff;"
| 
| 14.17 (101)
| 
| 11.10 (76)
| Windy Hill
| 16,828
| 9 May 1981
|- style="background:#fff;"
| 
| 18.15 (123)
| 
| 7.16 (58)
| Victoria Park
| 20,553
| 9 May 1981
|- style="background:#fff;"
| 
| 8.8 (56)
| 
| 7.17 (59)
| Princes Park
| 13,275
| 9 May 1981
|- style="background:#fff;"
| 
| 8.8 (56)
| 
| 12.24 (96)
| MCG
| 22,020
| 9 May 1981
|- style="background:#fff;"
| 
| 17.16 (118)
| 
| 7.12 (54)
| VFL Park
| 10,989
| 9 May 1981

Round 8

|- style="background:#ccf;"
| Home team
| Home team score
| Away team
| Away team score
| Venue
| Crowd
| Date
|- style="background:#fff;"
| 
| 8.16 (64)
| 
| 25.18 (168)
| Moorabbin Oval
| 16,860
| 16 May 1981
|- style="background:#fff;"
| 
| 17.25 (127)
| 
| 12.11 (83)
| Lake Oval
| 12,808
| 16 May 1981
|- style="background:#fff;"
| 
| 25.17 (167)
| 
| 17.15 (117)
| MCG
| 21,721
| 16 May 1981
|- style="background:#fff;"
| 
| 21.18 (144)
| 
| 16.19 (115)
| Princes Park
| 17,459
| 16 May 1981
|- style="background:#fff;"
| 
| 12.8 (80)
| 
| 12.13 (85)
| Kardinia Park
| 28,396
| 16 May 1981
|- style="background:#fff;"
| 
| 14.3 (87)
| 
| 21.18 (144)
| VFL Park
| 79,326
| 16 May 1981

Round 9

|- style="background:#ccf;"
| Home team
| Home team score
| Away team
| Away team score
| Venue
| Crowd
| Date
|- style="background:#fff;"
| 
| 10.14 (74)
| 
| 11.18 (84)
| Western Oval
| 13,789
| 23 May 1981
|- style="background:#fff;"
| 
| 13.15 (93)
| 
| 16.18 (114)
| Junction Oval
| 15,604
| 23 May 1981
|- style="background:#fff;"
| 
| 25.22 (172)
| 
| 11.7 (73)
| Princes Park
| 22,445
| 23 May 1981
|- style="background:#fff;"
| 
| 10.10 (70)
| 
| 14.20 (104)
| MCG
| 31,769
| 23 May 1981
|- style="background:#fff;"
| 
| 12.26 (98)
| 
| 16.15 (111)
| Arden Street Oval
| 24,625
| 23 May 1981
|- style="background:#fff;"
| 
| 20.16 (136)
| 
| 15.15 (105)
| VFL Park
| 40,240
| 23 May 1981

Round 10

|- style="background:#ccf;"
| Home team
| Home team score
| Away team
| Away team score
| Venue
| Crowd
| Date
|- style="background:#fff;"
| 
| 13.17 (95)
| 
| 11.14 (80)
| Princes Park
| 14,961
| 30 May 1981
|- style="background:#fff;"
| 
| 14.8 (92)
| 
| 10.10 (70)
| Kardinia Park
| 19,760
| 30 May 1981
|- style="background:#fff;"
| 
| 22.15 (147)
| 
| 10.10 (70)
| Junction Oval
| 11,630
| 30 May 1981
|- style="background:#fff;"
| 
| 17.10 (112)
| 
| 8.9 (57)
| Victoria Park
| 37,177
| 30 May 1981
|- style="background:#fff;"
| 
| 11.13 (79)
| 
| 6.8 (44)
| Windy Hill
| 30,574
| 30 May 1981
|- style="background:#fff;"
| 
| 6.7 (43)
| 
| 25.22 (172)
| VFL Park
| 17,015
| 30 May 1981

Round 11

|- style="background:#ccf;"
| Home team
| Home team score
| Away team
| Away team score
| Venue
| Crowd
| Date
|- style="background:#fff;"
| 
| 20.16 (136)
| 
| 14.10 (94)
| MCG
| 31,025
| 6 June 1981
|- style="background:#fff;"
| 
| 14.15 (99)
| 
| 7.17 (59)
| Moorabbin Oval
| 21,672
| 6 June 1981

|- style="background:#fff;"
| 
| 17.13 (115)
| 
| 11.18 (84)
| Princes Park
| 31,808
| 6 June 1981
|- style="background:#fff;"
| 
| 18.19 (127)
| 
| 12.9 (81)
| VFL Park
| 92,935
| 8 June 1981
|- style="background:#fff;"
| 
| 12.10 (82)
| 
| 17.15 (117)
| Western Oval
| 24,974
| 8 June 1981
|- style="background:#fff;"
| 
| 12.8 (80)
| 
| 15.18 (108)
| Lake Oval
| 28,588
| 8 June 1981

Round 12

|- style="background:#ccf;"
| Home team
| Home team score
| Away team
| Away team score
| Venue
| Crowd
| Date
|- style="background:#fff;"
| 
| 19.21 (135)
| 
| 4.11 (35)
| Kardinia Park
| 22,154
| 13 June 1981
|- style="background:#fff;"
| 
| 21.13 (139)
| 
| 14.16 (100)
| Princes Park
| 27,000
| 13 June 1981
|- style="background:#fff;"
| 
| 13.12 (90)
| 
| 17.32 (134)
| MCG
| 17,691
| 13 June 1981
|- style="background:#fff;"
| 
| 13.12 (90)
| 
| 18.29 (137)
| Arden Street Oval
| 22,526
| 13 June 1981
|- style="background:#fff;"
| 
| 13.15 (93)
| 
| 14.14 (98)
| Western Oval
| 20,903
| 13 June 1981
|- style="background:#fff;"
| 
| 19.12 (126)
| 
| 16.15 (111)
| VFL Park
| 24,588
| 13 June 1981

Round 13

|- style="background:#ccf;"
| Home team
| Home team score
| Away team
| Away team score
| Venue
| Crowd
| Date
|- style="background:#fff;"
| 
| 20.18 (138)
| 
| 15.16 (106)
| Princes Park
| 11,657
| 20 June 1981
|- style="background:#fff;"
| 
| 26.14 (170)
| 
| 8.8 (56)
| Kardinia Park
| 27,395
| 20 June 1981
|- style="background:#fff;"
| 
| 12.22 (94)
| 
| 13.12 (90)
| Windy Hill
| 30,718
| 20 June 1981
|- style="background:#fff;"
| 
| 19.14 (128)
| 
| 10.11 (71)
| Victoria Park
| 23,669
| 20 June 1981
|- style="background:#fff;"
| 
| 20.11 (131)
| 
| 15.16 (106)
| Junction Oval
| 18,455
| 20 June 1981
|- style="background:#fff;"
| 
| 14.10 (94)
| 
| 19.11 (125)
| VFL Park
| 15,599
| 20 June 1981

Round 14

|- style="background:#ccf;"
| Home team
| Home team score
| Away team
| Away team score
| Venue
| Crowd
| Date
|- style="background:#fff;"
| 
| 15.25 (115)
| 
| 5.4 (34)
| Princes Park
| 17,419
| 27 June 1981
|- style="background:#fff;"
| 
| 21.23 (149)
| 
| 15.16 (106)
| MCG
| 31,212
| 27 June 1981
|- style="background:#fff;"
| 
| 18.19 (127)
| 
| 8.7 (55)
| Moorabbin Oval
| 14,058
| 27 June 1981
|- style="background:#fff;"
| 
| 9.16 (70)
| 
| 14.9 (93)
| Lake Oval
| 11,756
| 27 June 1981
|- style="background:#fff;"
| 
| 13.8 (86)
| 
| 9.14 (68)
| VFL Park
| 50,441
| 27 June 1981
|- style="background:#fff;"
| 
| 20.13 (133)
| 
| 22.19 (151)
| The Gabba
| 20,351
| 28 June 1981

Round 15

|- style="background:#ccf;"
| Home team
| Home team score
| Away team
| Away team score
| Venue
| Crowd
| Date
|- style="background:#fff;"
| 
| 7.13 (55)
| 
| 16.19 (115)
| Arden Street Oval
| 8,160
| 4 July 1981
|- style="background:#fff;"
| 
| 8.13 (61)
| 
| 11.14 (80)
| Junction Oval
| 18,374
| 4 July 1981
|- style="background:#fff;"
| 
| 6.14 (50)
| 
| 5.5 (35)
| VFL Park
| 21,579
| 4 July 1981
|- style="background:#fff;"
| 
| 12.10 (82)
| 
| 8.4 (52)
| Kardinia Park
| 26,635
| 11 July 1981
|- style="background:#fff;"
| 
| 7.9 (51)
| 
| 17.12 (114)
| Western Oval
| 10,478
| 11 July 1981
|- style="background:#fff;"
| 
| 10.6 (66)
| 
| 12.16 (88)
| MCG
| 30,803
| 11 July 1981

Round 16

|- style="background:#ccf;"
| Home team
| Home team score
| Away team
| Away team score
| Venue
| Crowd
| Date
|- style="background:#fff;"
| 
| 12.14 (86)
| 
| 20.11 (131)
| Princes Park
| 19,519
| 18 July 1981
|- style="background:#fff;"
| 
| 22.21 (153)
| 
| 8.12 (60)
| Windy Hill
| 21,588
| 18 July 1981
|- style="background:#fff;"
| 
| 22.19 (151)
| 
| 16.4 (100)
| Lake Oval
| 13,297
| 18 July 1981
|- style="background:#fff;"
| 
| 12.7 (79)
| 
| 22.35 (167)
| MCG
| 21,947
| 18 July 1981
|- style="background:#fff;"
| 
| 11.11 (77)
| 
| 10.16 (76)
| Victoria Park
| 30,708
| 18 July 1981
|- style="background:#fff;"
| 
| 18.13 (121)
| 
| 12.15 (87)
| VFL Park
| 17,713
| 18 July 1981

Round 17

|- style="background:#ccf;"
| Home team
| Home team score
| Away team
| Away team score
| Venue
| Crowd
| Date
|- style="background:#fff;"
| 
| 10.11 (71)
| 
| 8.9 (57)
| Kardinia Park
| 24,750
| 25 July 1981
|- style="background:#fff;"
| 
| 18.8 (116)
| 
| 19.11 (125)
| Western Oval
| 14,755
| 25 July 1981
|- style="background:#fff;"
| 
| 23.15 (153)
| 
| 15.10 (100)
| Princes Park
| 15,198
| 25 July 1981
|- style="background:#fff;"
| 
| 16.19 (115)
| 
| 17.14 (116)
| MCG
| 37,589
| 25 July 1981
|- style="background:#fff;"
| 
| 12.4 (76)
| 
| 12.21 (93)
| Moorabbin Oval
| 23,126
| 25 July 1981
|- style="background:#fff;"
| 
| 18.13 (121)
| 
| 15.13 (103)
| SCG
| 22,238
| 26 July 1981

Round 18

|- style="background:#ccf;"
| Home team
| Home team score
| Away team
| Away team score
| Venue
| Crowd
| Date
|- style="background:#fff;"
| 
| 16.21 (117)
| 
| 12.13 (85)
| Arden Street Oval
| 11,517
| 1 August 1981
|- style="background:#fff;"
| 
| 12.14 (86)
| 
| 17.13 (115)
| MCG
| 13,886
| 1 August 1981
|- style="background:#fff;"
| 
| 10.13 (73)
| 
| 7.19 (61)
| Junction Oval
| 16,013
| 1 August 1981
|- style="background:#fff;"
| 
| 17.13 (115)
| 
| 12.10 (82)
| Princes Park
| 31,507
| 1 August 1981
|- style="background:#fff;"
| 
| 9.15 (69)
| 
| 15.13 (103)
| VFL Park
| 19,725
| 1 August 1981
|- style="background:#fff;"
| 
| 12.16 (88)
| 
| 9.15 (69)
| MCG
| 64,149
| 2 August 1981

Round 19

|- style="background:#ccf;"
| Home team
| Home team score
| Away team
| Away team score
| Venue
| Crowd
| Date
|- style="background:#fff;"
| 
| 14.20 (104)
| 
| 9.6 (60)
| Windy Hill
| 15,411
| 8 August 1981
|- style="background:#fff;"
| 
| 14.19 (103)
| 
| 11.13 (79)
| Victoria Park
| 21,237
| 8 August 1981
|- style="background:#fff;"
| 
| 9.11 (65)
| 
| 10.11 (71)
| Moorabbin Oval
| 15,943
| 8 August 1981
|- style="background:#fff;"
| 
| 15.21 (111)
| 
| 13.12 (90)
| Princes Park
| 8,058
| 8 August 1981
|- style="background:#fff;"
| 
| 11.19 (85)
| 
| 9.16 (70)
| VFL Park
| 25,565
| 8 August 1981
|- style="background:#fff;"
| 
| 8.14 (62)
| 
| 13.7 (85)
| MCG
| 24,287
| 9 August 1981

Round 20

|- style="background:#ccf;"
| Home team
| Home team score
| Away team
| Away team score
| Venue
| Crowd
| Date
|- style="background:#fff;"
| 
| 15.8 (98)
| 
| 14.15 (99)
| Princes Park
| 36,736
| 15 August 1981
|- style="background:#fff;"
| 
| 21.19 (145)
| 
| 13.9 (87)
| Arden Street Oval
| 7,749
| 15 August 1981
|- style="background:#fff;"
| 
| 12.14 (86)
| 
| 21.13 (139)
| Lake Oval
| 11,489
| 15 August 1981
|- style="background:#fff;"
| 
| 12.14 (86)
| 
| 22.15 (147)
| Western Oval
| 11,770
| 15 August 1981
|- style="background:#fff;"
| 
| 11.20 (86)
| 
| 14.7 (91)
| MCG
| 69,217
| 15 August 1981
|- style="background:#fff;"
| 
| 9.14 (68)
| 
| 10.17 (77)
| VFL Park
| 20,863
| 15 August 1981

Round 21

|- style="background:#ccf;"
| Home team
| Home team score
| Away team
| Away team score
| Venue
| Crowd
| Date
|- style="background:#fff;"
| 
| 15.9 (99)
| 
| 17.14 (116)
| MCG
| 19,567
| 22 August 1981
|- style="background:#fff;"
| 
| 14.18 (102)
| 
| 9.10 (64)
| Junction Oval
| 12,130
| 22 August 1981
|- style="background:#fff;"
| 
| 26.23 (179)
| 
| 10.8 (68)
| Windy Hill
| 18,773
| 22 August 1981
|- style="background:#fff;"
| 
| 22.17 (149)
| 
| 11.10 (76)
| Victoria Park
| 26,680
| 22 August 1981
|- style="background:#fff;"
| 
| 18.20 (128)
| 
| 8.11 (59)
| Kardinia Park
| 17,573
| 22 August 1981
|- style="background:#fff;"
| 
| 8.14 (62)
| 
| 12.12 (84)
| VFL Park
| 25,544
| 22 August 1981

Round 22

|- style="background:#ccf;"
| Home team
| Home team score
| Away team
| Away team score
| Venue
| Crowd
| Date
|- style="background:#fff;"
| 
| 15.20 (110)
| 
| 8.9 (57)
| Princes Park
| 7,912
| 29 August 1981
|- style="background:#fff;"
| 
| 4.9 (33)
| 
| 8.11 (59)
| Victoria Park
| 32,393
| 29 August 1981
|- style="background:#fff;"
| 
| 10.14 (74)
| 
| 15.17 (107)
| Lake Oval
| 8,484
| 29 August 1981
|- style="background:#fff;"
| 
| 12.15 (87)
| 
| 5.8 (38)
| Moorabbin Oval
| 11,948
| 29 August 1981
|- style="background:#fff;"
| 
| 5.10 (40)
| 
| 9.13 (67)
| MCG
| 64,207
| 29 August 1981
|- style="background:#fff;"
| 
| 6.11 (47)
| 
| 7.13 (55)
| VFL Park
| 75,221
| 29 August 1981

Ladder

Finals

Week One

Week Two

Week three

Week four

See also
 McIntyre "final five" system

Notes
 The leading goalkicker was Michael Roach of Richmond with 86 goals
 The Brownlow Medal was shared by Bernie Quinlan and Barry Round
Geelong 21.14 (140) defeated  18.6 (114) in the grand final, held as a curtain-raiser to the seniors grand final on 26 September.

Notable events
In the 1980/81 offseason, the East Perth Football Club from the West Australian Football League made a unilateral bid to join the VFL, potentially as early as 1983. East Perth's vision was for two WAFL clubs to join the league, as part of a transition to a national competition, and to limit the drain of talent from and provide an opportunity to play the highest level of football in Western Australia. The application was rejected.
 A protest by Richmond against the eligibility of defender Doug Cox to play for St. Kilda led to the Saints temporarily losing the points for their first two wins after Round 8. They were reinstated after Round 17 due to changes in the relevant rules, but a fine of $5000 remained.
Carlton ended up granting him a clearance to South Melbourne, but South Melbourne was deemed to have broken the league's poaching laws by having "negotiated with an agent acting for a Carlton player".
 In Round 11, Kevin Bartlett became the first to play 350 VFL games, after having broken John Rantall's record for most games played during 1980.
 Malcolm Blight (North Melbourne) and Alex Jesaulenko (St Kilda) became the final ever playing coaches in VFL/AFL history. Jesaulenko retired as player after Round 8, becoming the last captain-coach; Blight was sacked as coach after Round 16, making him the last person ever to be a playing coach of a club. (Blight was not captain during his time as playing coach.) Playing coaches have since been prohibited under salary cap regulations instituted in 1987.
The State Government granted the VFL once-off permission to trial two Sunday matches in Victoria during the season; it was the first time the VFL had been granted this permission since the once-off Sunday match in 1970 which coincided with a royal visit. Under the conditions of the trial, alcohol was not allowed to be sold at or brought to the games, and the games could not be televised. The two matches were  vs  in Round 18, and  vs  in Round 19.
On 7 August, the VFL's entire senior umpiring panel resigned over a contract dispute, due to the VFL's refusal to commit to negotiating a collective agreement with the Umpires' Association, rather than individual agreements with each umpire. The VFL hastily arranged for Round 19's matches to be umpired by a team of junior umpires, all aged between 18 and 22, from the state's minor leagues; both the junior umpires' association and the VFL umpires' association gave their approval for the juniors to serve as strikebreakers. The dispute was resolved the following week, and the senior umpires returned for Round 20.
 In Round 22, South Melbourne played its last senior VFL match at the Lake Oval (also known then as Lakeside Oval). The team relocated to Sydney in 1982 and eventually became known as the Sydney Swans.

References

Bibliography
 Stephen Rogers and Ashley Brown (1998). Every Game Ever Played. 6th ed. Victoria: Penguin Books.

External Links
 1981 VFL season scores at AFL Tables

Australian Football League seasons
VFL season